The Journal of Creative Behavior is a quarterly peer-reviewed academic journal published by Wiley-Blackwell on behalf of the Creative Education Foundation.  The journal was established in 1967.  Its current editors are Ronald A. Beghetto (Arizona State University) and Maciej Karwowski (University of Wroclaw). The journal focuses on creativity and problem solving, including ways to foster creative productivity, creative learning, management of creative personnel, testing, creativity in business and industry, development of creative curricula, and creativity in the arts and the sciences.

According to the Journal Citation Reports, the journal has a 2020 impact factor of 3.153, ranking it 18 out of 61 journals in the category "Psychology, Educational".

References

External links 
 

Wiley-Blackwell academic journals
English-language journals
Publications established in 1967
Psychology of creativity journals